William Henry Barnes (c.1827–23 July 1918) was a New Zealand blacksmith and labour reformer . He was born in Manchester, Lancashire, England on c.1827.

References

1827 births
1918 deaths
English emigrants to New Zealand
New Zealand blacksmiths
People from Christchurch
People from Manchester
New Zealand trade unionists